Kevin Jan Magnussen (born 5 October 1992) is a Danish racing driver currently competing in Formula One for Haas F1 Team.

He is the son of four-time Le Mans winner and former Formula One driver Jan Magnussen. Magnussen drove for Haas from  until the end of the  season. In 2022, Magnussen rejoined Haas on a multi-year deal.

Early career
Born in Roskilde, Denmark, Magnussen began his career in karting. In 2008 he made the step up to Formula Ford in Denmark, taking 11 victories from 15 races and winning the championship. He also took part in six races of the ADAC Formel Masters series.

In 2009 Magnussen moved up to Formula Renault 2.0 with Motopark Academy. He finished runner-up to António Félix da Costa in the Northern European Cup and finished seventh in the Eurocup.

In 2010 Magnussen competed in the German Formula Three Championship with Motopark Academy, winning the opening round of the season at Oschersleben and taking two more race victories. He finished third in the championship, taking the rookie title in the process.

In 2011 Magnussen moved to the British Formula 3 Championship with Carlin. He took seven race victories and finished as championship runner-up to teammate Felipe Nasr. He also competed in the Masters of Formula 3 race at Zandvoort, finishing 3rd. 2011 marked Magnussen's first and only appearance at the Macau Grand Prix. He placed 7th in qualifying, but was forced to start from the back of the grid in the qualification race after ignoring yellow flags. He started the main race from 19th place, but was eliminated after a high-speed collision late in the race.

Magnussen moved up to the Formula Renault 3.5 Series in 2012 with the Carlin team, with Will Stevens as his teammate. Magnussen finished the opening race at Motorland Aragón in 2nd place, and took pole position in both races at Spa-Francorchamps, converting the second into a race victory. He ended the season in 7th place in the championship. He remained in Formula Renault 3.5 for 2013, moving to DAMS alongside Norman Nato. 2013 was far more successful for Magnussen, claiming five victories, eight other podium places and eight pole positions. He finished the season as champion, 60 points clear of runner-up Stoffel Vandoorne.

Formula One career

Magnussen had his first experience of the McLaren MP4-27 Formula One car on track at the Abu Dhabi Young Driver test in 2012. He set a quickest time of 1:42.651. Previously he had done work in the team's driving simulator. Magnussen's time was the best of the three-day test impressing McLaren's sporting director Sam Michael. The distance he covered in the course of the test was sufficient to earn his FIA Super Licence.

McLaren (2014–2015)

2014 

Magnussen would drive for McLaren for the  season, replacing Sergio Pérez. In line with a new rule introduced for the 2014 season requiring drivers to choose a car number to use during their Formula One career, Magnussen raced with number 20 as this was the number he had on his DAMS car in 2013 when he won the Formula Renault 3.5 championship.

At the Jerez and Bahrain pre-season tests he topped the timesheets, and at the first race in Australia, he qualified in fourth position. In the race itself, Magnussen avoided crashing at the start after his car encountered oversteer through wheelspin. After passing Lewis Hamilton's ailing Mercedes in the early stages, Magnussen maintained position to take a third-place finish; he finished 2.2 seconds behind Red Bull's Daniel Ricciardo. As a result, Magnussen became the second Danish driver – after his father Jan, who was sixth at the 1998 Canadian Grand Prix – to take a points-scoring finish, the first Danish podium finisher and the first debutant, since Hamilton at the 2007 Australian Grand Prix, to take a podium in his first Grand Prix. After the race, Magnussen described the result as "like a victory". He was later promoted to second place in the results, after Ricciardo was disqualified due to fuel irregularities, making him the first rookie to finish second since Jacques Villeneuve at the 1996 Australian Grand Prix. Magnussen recorded eleven further points-scoring finishes throughout 2014, the majority being ninth- or tenth-place finishes; although Magnussen recorded seventh-place finishes in Austria and Great Britain – circuits where he had prior experience from junior formulae – and a fifth-place finish in Russia.

2015 

Fernando Alonso replaced Magnussen for the 2015 season and Magnussen became the test and reserve driver for McLaren. Magnussen had talks with Honda-powered team Andretti Autosport to compete in the 2015 IndyCar Series, but McLaren blocked the deal. Magnussen competed in one race, the  after doctors advised Alonso to not race due to a concussion sustained during an accident during pre-season testing. However, Magnussen failed to start the race after suffering an engine failure on the formation lap. Magnussen was released from McLaren at the end of the year.

Renault (2016)

After being released by McLaren, Magnussen was confirmed to have been in discussion to drive for the Haas F1 Team, before Romain Grosjean and Esteban Gutiérrez were named as the team's drivers. Magnussen had reportedly also been in talks about a seat at Manor Racing. Magnussen tested a Mercedes DTM car, and Porsche's LMP1 car, hinting that he may have had options outside Formula One, including IndyCar, where he was believed to have entered talks with Bryan Herta Autosport about a drive.

In early 2016 unconfirmed reports emerged that Magnussen was set to replace Pastor Maldonado at Renault following a breach of contract between Maldonado and the team. Renault had purchased the Lotus F1 Team and were returning to the sport after a four-year hiatus. Renault later confirmed Magnussen had joined their  campaign, partnering rookie Jolyon Palmer.

Magnussen's early season was marred by a string of incidents. He suffered a puncture on the opening lap in Australia and went on to finish 12th. He was forced to start from the pit lane in Bahrain after failing to stop for the weighbridge in practice. He then crashed in practice for the  after a tyre failure and could only finish the race in 17th. Magnussen collided with teammate Palmer in Spain and received a ten-second time penalty, then crashed in practice in Monaco before colliding with Daniil Kvyat in the race. He was forced to miss qualifying in Canada after again crashing during practice, and started from the pit lane in Azerbaijan when his car was modified under parc fermé conditions. The  was an exception to these incidents; after qualifying 17th he came back to finish 7th in what would eventually be Renault's best finish of the season.

Magnussen claimed his second and final points-finish of the season with 10th place in Singapore. Two more mechanical retirements came before the end of the season; power loss in Malaysia and suspension damage in Abu Dhabi. Magnussen finished the season in 16th place in the championship, scoring seven of Renault's eight points that season.

Haas (2017–2020, 2022–)

2017

Magnussen retired from his first race with Haas in Australia with reported suspension failure, however it later emerged that he had actually suffered a puncture and that his retirement was unnecessary. He scored points with 8th place at the following race in China before retiring with electrical problems in Bahrain. He was running 9th in Spain but made contact with Daniil Kvyat late in the race, causing him to fall to 14th with a puncture. He would claim a point with 10th place at the next race in Monaco, in what was Haas's first ever double points-finish.

A string of seven races without points followed. This included a hydraulic failure in Austria, engine issues in Singapore, and an incident in Hungary where he forced Nico Hülkenberg off the track, damaging Hülkenberg's car and forcing him to retire. Hülkenberg confronted Magnussen after the race, branding him the "most unsporting driver on the grid" to which Magnussen replied "suck my balls". Magnussen ended the season with two 8th-place finishes in Japan and Mexico, but collided with former Formula Renault rival Stoffel Vandoorne in Brazil, causing both cars to retire.

Magnussen ended the season 14th in the championship with 19 points, nine points short of teammate Grosjean.

2018

Magnussen retained his seat at Haas for the  season. The Haas VF-18 was a vast improvement on its predecessor, enabling Magnussen to compete at the front of the midfield. At the opening race in Australia, Magnussen lined up 5th on the grid, Haas's highest ever starting position. He had run as high as 4th, however both Haas cars would retire from the race after their wheels were fitted incorrectly during their pit stops. Magnussen then finished 5th in Bahrain, his best result since the 2014 Russian Grand Prix. At the  he collided with Pierre Gasly, who criticised Magnussen's defensive driving and branded him "the most dangerous guy" he had ever raced with.

Magnussen scored valuable points again with a 6th-place finish in Spain. Another 6th place came in France, followed by 5th place in Austria behind teammate Grosjean, the team's best ever race result. More points finishes soon followed with 9th in Britain, 7th in Hungary and 8th in Belgium. Magnussen later commented that Alonso "thinks he's God" and "I can’t wait for him to retire". Magnussen collided with Sergio Pérez during the race, damaging the Haas's floor and eventually causing Magnussen to finish last of the running cars in 16th. Similar woes came in Singapore, when he failed to progress out of the first part of qualifying and he struggled to overtake during the race, finishing 18th. However, he set the fastest lap of the race after a late pit stop for fresh tyres, his and the team's first fastest lap. Magnussen then qualified 5th and finished 8th in Russia.

Magnussen received a puncture, which damaged his floor and forced him into retirement. Magnussen ended the season with two more points finishes, 9th in Brazil and 10th in Abu Dhabi.

He finished the season 9th in the championship with 56 points, his best ever finish and 19 points clear of teammate Grosjean.

2019 

Magnussen continued to drive for Haas for the 2019 season alongside Grosjean. The Haas VF-19 proved uncompetitive and became more so as the season went on. The car often performed well during qualifying but suffered during the race. At the first race in Australia, Magnussen finished 6th in what would later turn out to be his best finish of the season. He finished 13th at the next three races, despite having qualified in the top ten in two of them. He recorded another points finish in Spain, finishing 7th.

Poor finishes followed at the next five races. In Austria, Magnussen showed the strong qualifying pace of the VF-19 by qualifying in 5th, before a gearbox penalty dropped him to 10th on the grid. During the race he was found to have over-stepped his grid line at the start, receiving a drive-through penalty and eventually finishing the race in 19th place. In Britain, Magnussen and teammate Grosjean made contact on the first lap, causing race-ending damage for both drivers. Both were blamed and criticised for the incident, at a race in which Grosjean was testing the old spec of the VF-19 so that the team could understand their recent lack of pace.

Magnussen next scored points at the rain-affected German Grand Prix, finishing 10th before being promoted to 8th after the Alfa Romeo drivers were penalised post-race for the use of driver aids. He retired in Italy with a hydraulics issue, before setting the fastest lap at the next race in Singapore, a feat he had achieved at the same race in 2018. He was not awarded a point for this as he finished in 17th place—a driver must finish in the top ten to be awarded a fastest lap point. A 9th-place finish in Russia would be his fourth and final points finish of the season. His third retirement of the season came in the United States when he suffered a brake failure on the penultimate lap.

Magnussen finished the season in 16th place in the championship with 20 points, 12 points ahead of teammate Grosjean.

2020

The opening two rounds of the championship at the Red Bull Ring proved to be difficult for Magnussen and Haas, as the Haas VF-20 was off the pace. Whilst he ultimately fell back throughout the race, he managed to cross the finish line in ninth. After the race, it was determined that Haas had broken rules regarding team radio in telling both drivers to pit at the end of the formation lap, and Magnussen was given a ten-second penalty. This demoted him to tenth, and Magnussen claimed his and Haas' first point of the year.

Magnussen and teammate Grosjean departed the team at the end of the 2020 season, to be replaced with Formula 2 champion Mick Schumacher, as well as Nikita Mazepin for the 2021 World Championship.

2022
Following the Russian invasion of Ukraine, Haas terminated its contract with their driver Nikita Mazepin. Magnussen returned to the team as his replacement on a multi-year deal, partnering existing driver Mick Schumacher for the 2022 season. In his return for Haas at Bahrain, Magnussen managed to start 7th and finish 5th, scoring one of only five top five finishes in Haas's history up to that point. In the 2022 Saudi Arabian Grand Prix, he made it into Q3 and qualified tenth. He later turned that into a ninth-place finish, securing Haas consecutive points for the first time since 2019. Magnussen finished 10th at Silverstone with his teammate Mick Schumacher finishing eighth giving Haas a first double-point finish since Germany 2019, and the pair would continue this run by scoring points again in the following round in Austria, despite the Dane experiencing engine issues during the race. At the 2022 São Paulo Grand Prix, Magnussen took his and Haas’ first pole position in Formula One. Magnussen qualified first after George Russell spun at turn 4, bringing out a red flag during which track conditions deteriorated meaning no driver could set a faster time than before the crash. Magnussen became just the second driver in F1 history to set a pole for a non-Ferrari team using a Ferrari engine, 14 years after Sebastian Vettel did so for Toro Rosso at the 2008 Italian Grand Prix. He would ultimately finish the sprint race in 8th position, and would retire from the Grand Prix on the opening lap following a collision with Daniel Ricciardo.

Sports car racing

2015 
Magnussen tested for Porsche in a Porsche 919 Hybrid in November 2015, on Circuit de Barcelona-Catalunya. No contract was made since Magnussen continued in Formula One for Renault in 2016.

2021 
Magnussen competed in the WeatherTech SportsCar Championship in 2021, driving the No. 01 Chip Ganassi Racing DPi car alongside Dutch driver Renger van der Zande. On 12 June, he won his first race at the Detroit Grand Prix. Magnussen ended the season 7th.

On 23 April, it was announced that Magnussen would drive the No. 49 High Class Racing LMP2 car with his father Jan Magnussen and Anders Fjordbach in the 2021 24 Hours of Le Mans. He classified 29th in the overall standings and 17th in the LMP2 class.

2022 
On 8 February 2021, it was announced that Magnussen would be a part of the driver line-up for Peugeot Sport in the 2022 FIA World Endurance Championship season.

Magnussen competed in the WeatherTech SportsCar Championship in 2022, as third driver in the No. 02 Chip Ganassi Racing DPi car alongside Earl Bamber and Alex Lynn, but was released from his contracts with Peugeot and Chip Ganassi Racing after returning to Formula One with Haas in 2022.

 Following the Formula One season finale at the 2022 Abu Dhabi Grand Prix, it was confirmed that Magnussen would race alongside his father Jan at the 2022 Gulf 12 Hours at the Yas Marina Circuit, during the final round of the 2022 Intercontinental GT Challenge. Magnussen qualified 15th on the grid for the race and subsequently finished seventh place overall, less than a second behind sixth after a clean race.

2023 
Magnussen was confirmed to compete alongside his father in the 2023 24 Hours of Daytona in a new Porsche 911 GT3 R, run by MDK Motorsports, the same team that ran his Ferrari in the Gulf 12 Hours. However, he withdrew from the event a week prior due to necessary hand surgery.

IndyCar
In June 2021, Magnussen was drafted in by Arrow McLaren SP to fill in for the injured Felix Rosenqvist at the Grand Prix of Road America. He qualified 21st and retired with mechanical issues during the race.

Personal life
Magnussen lived in Woking, Surrey, near the McLaren Technology Centre whilst racing for McLaren. He currently lives in Copenhagen, Denmark with his family.

Between participating in Formula Ford in 2008 and unexpectedly securing sponsorship for Formula Renault in 2009, Magnussen was forced to abandon his racing career and work as a factory welder due to lack of funding.

In 2019, Magnussen married Louise Gjørup in a private ceremony. They have a daughter, born in 2021.

Racing record

Career summary

 Season still in progress.

Complete Formula Renault 3.5 Series results
(key) (Races in bold indicate pole position; races in italics indicate fastest lap)

 Did not finish, but was classified as he had completed more than 90% of the race distance.

Complete Formula One results
(key) (Races in bold indicate pole position; races in italics indicate fastest lap)

 Did not finish, but was classified as he had completed more than 90% of the race distance.
 Season still in progress.

Complete IMSA SportsCar Championship results
(key) (Races in bold indicate pole position; races in italics indicate fastest lap)

IndyCar Series

Complete 24 Hours of Le Mans results

Complete Gulf 12 Hours results

Notes

References

External links

Career statistics at Driver Database

1992 births
Living people
People from Roskilde
Danish racing drivers
Danish Formula One drivers
McLaren Formula One drivers
Formula Ford drivers
Formula Renault 2.0 NEC drivers
Portuguese Formula Renault 2.0 drivers
Formula Renault Eurocup drivers
ADAC Formel Masters drivers
German Formula Three Championship drivers
Formula 3 Euro Series drivers
British Formula Three Championship drivers
World Series Formula V8 3.5 drivers
Renault Formula One drivers
Haas Formula One drivers
WeatherTech SportsCar Championship drivers
24 Hours of Daytona drivers
IndyCar Series drivers
24 Hours of Le Mans drivers
Van Amersfoort Racing drivers
Motopark Academy drivers
Carlin racing drivers
DAMS drivers
Chip Ganassi Racing drivers
Arrow McLaren SP drivers
Sportspeople from Region Zealand
AF Corse drivers
Danish expatriate sportspeople in England